Philippa's crombec (Sylvietta philippae), also known as the short-billed crombec, is a species of African warbler, formerly placed in the family Sylviidae.  It is found in Ethiopia and Somalia.  Its natural habitat is dry savanna.

Description
The species is about 8 cm, weighing 9-10 g. Its upper parts are greyish in colour, with a thin white supercilium and throat. The lower parts are yellowish. The bill is noticeably short compared to other species of Sylvietta.

References

Philippa's crombec
Birds of the Horn of Africa
Philippa's crombec
Taxonomy articles created by Polbot